Limeyrat is a former railway station in Limeyrat, Nouvelle-Aquitaine, France. The station is located on the Coutras - Tulle railway line. The station is served by TER Nouvelle-Aquitaine bus services on demand to Saint-Pierre-de-Chignac. Train services were suspended in 2020.

References

Railway stations in France opened in 1890
Defunct railway stations in Dordogne